Stanbic Holdings Plc, formerly known as CfC Stanbic Holdings Limited, is a financial services organization in Kenya. The Group's headquarters are located in Nairobi, Kenya, with subsidiaries in Kenya and South Sudan. Stanbic Holdings is a member of the Standard Bank Group, a financial services giant based in South Africa. The institution is licensed and governed by the Central Bank of Kenya, the national banking regulator.

Overview
The institution serves the banking needs of large and small business customers as well as individuals. Stanbic Holdings Plc is a large financial services organization in Kenya, with an asset base valued at over KSh 180.51 billion (US$1.78 billion), as of December 2013. At that time, shareholder's equity was valued at about KSh 32.43 billion (US$319.696 million).

History
CfC Stanbic Holdings, as it exists today, is the result of a merger between Stanbic Bank Kenya Limited and CfC Bank Limited.

Before the merger

Stanbic Bank Kenya Limited 
Stanbic Bank Kenya Limited (SBK) was established in 1958 when Ottoman Bank incorporated its first subsidiary in the region. This was after acquiring Torr's Hotel from Ewart Grogan and converting it to its head office. In 1969, Ottoman Bank sold its Kenyan operations to National and Grindlays Bank (NGB Kenya) making its exit from the East African market.

In 1970, the Kenya government and NGB entered into an agreement that saw the government takeover full control of NGB Kenya with the exception of the two branches inherited from Ottoman Bank, one in Nairobi while the other in Mombasa. NGB Kenya was then rebranded to Kenya Commercial Bank while the two separated branches became Grindlays Bank International (Kenya) Limited (GBI). Shareholding in GBI was 60 per cent by NGB London and 40 per cent by the government of Kenya.

In 1992, Standard Bank Investment Corporation (Stanbic Bank), a subsidiary of Standard Bank, acquired GBI by virtue of it being part of ANZ Grindlays Bank's African subsidiaries. The bank's name was changed from Grindlays Bank International (Kenya) Limited to Stanbic Bank Kenya Limited in 1993. At the point of the merger, the bank was 96.31% owned by Standard Bank through Stanbic Africa Holdings Limited (SAHL) and the balance of 3.69% held by the Government of Kenya.

CfC Bank Limited
CFC Bank Limited (CFC Bank) was incorporated in 1955 as Credit Finance Corporation, a finance institution, and was listed on the Nairobi Stock Exchange. Due to changing trends, regulatory requirements in the Kenyan banking industry and the need to meet growing customer requirements, Credit Finance Corporation obtained a commercial banking license from the Central Bank of Kenya in March 1995 and changed its name to CfC Bank Limited. The bank was associated with Moi Era individuals such as Former Attorney-General Charles Njonjo, Jeremiah Kiereini and Bruce Mackenzie who held shares in the company through African Liaison and Consultants Services Limited. In 2004, CfC Bank entered into the insurance industry through the acquisition of American Life Insurance Company (Kenya) Limited, a subsidiary of AIG and changed its name to CfC Life Assurance Company Limited (now part of Liberty Kenya Holdings Limited).

Merger
On 12 November 2007, the shareholders of CFC Bank at an Extraordinary General Meeting approved the merger of CFC Bank and Stanbic Bank. This was the largest banking merger in Kenya's history. The Merger was executed in three interlinked phases:

 CfC Bank acquired 100% of SBK through the allotment new fully paid shares of CfC to SBK's shareholders.
 On completion of the allotment of shares in phase one, SAHL acquired an additional CfC shares from existing shareholders. SAHL's shareholding in CfC was increased to 60% of the revised share capital of CfC.
 On completion of phases one and two above, there was an internal reorganisation, effectively to transfer CfC's banking business to SBK to form a merged single banking operation. SBK was then renamed CfC Stanbic Bank Limited and retained its banking licence. The banking licence for CfC was returned to the Central Bank of Kenya to allow it to operate purely as a listed non-operating holding company, renamed CfC Stanbic Holdings Limited (CSHL).

The merger process was completed by 1 June 2008.

The Post merger structure was a follows:

Post-merger
After the Merger, the management engaged in restructuring of operation. In 2009, CfC Stanbic Holdings began restructuring its group corporate structure including the de-merger of the Insurance Businesses into CfC Insurance Holdings Limited. Liberty Holdings Limited came on-board as strategic investor in CfC Insurance Holdings Limited. The restructure involved consolidating all its insurance businesses to CfC Insurance Holdings Limited and later a de-merger of the insurance arm. This was completed in April 2011 with the listing of CfC Insurance Holdings Limited on the NSE through introduction. These shares were distributed to CfC Stanbic Holdings shareholders as a form of dividend. The Banking and Financial Services Businesses were retained in CfC Stanbic Holdings and remain the core business of the group. CfC Insurance Holdings Limited was later renamed Liberty Kenya Holdings Limited as a step of aligning the group to the Liberty group corporate brand.

Expansion
CfC Stanbic Holdings expanded into South Sudan in 2012 making it the third Kenyan bank to venture into the new African nation, after Kenya Commercial Bank Group and Equity Group Holdings Limited.

In August 2016, the group dropped the 'CfC' brand and was renamed Stanbic Holdings plc.

Member companies
The companies that comprise Stanbic Holdings include, but are not limited to, the following:
 Stanbic Bank Limited (100% share), a commercial bank in Kenya, serving individuals and businesses, focusing mainly on large corporations
 SBG Securities Limited (100% share), an Investment banking service provider in Nairobi
 CfC Stanbic Nominees Limited (100% share), holds securities purchased on behalf of customers of Stanbic Bank, under the custodial services arrangements. 
 CfC FS Nominees Limited (100% share), holds securities purchased on behalf of customers of SBG Securities Limited, under the custodial services arrangements.

Ownership
The stock of Stanbic Holdings listed on the NSE, where it trades under the symbol: CFC.

Governance
The Chairman of the Board of Directors of Stanbic Holdings, is Fred N. Ojiambo. Greg Brackenridge serves as the Chief Executive Officer.

See also
 Central Bank of Kenya
 Nairobi Stock Exchange
 Economy of Kenya
 Liberty Kenya Holdings Limited
 Standard Bank Group
 Liberty Holdings Limited
 List of banks in Kenya
 List of banks in South Sudan

References

External links
  CfC Stanbic Holdings
  Nairobi Stock Exchange Website
  Central Bank of Kenya
 List of Licensed Commercial Banks in Kenya

Banks of Kenya
Companies listed on the Nairobi Securities Exchange
Companies based in Nairobi
Banks established in 2008
Kenyan companies established in 2008